Ernst Rudolph Georg Eckert (September 13, 1904 – July 8, 2004) was an Austrian American engineer and scientist who advanced the film cooling technique for aeronautical engines. He earned his Diplom Ingenieur and doctorate in 1927 and 1931, respectively, and habilitated in 1938. Eckert worked as a jet engine scientist at the Aeronautical Research Institute in Braunschweig, Germany, then via Operation Paperclip, began jet propulsion research in 1945 at Wright-Patterson Air Force Base. In 1951, Eckert joined the University of Minnesota in the department of mechanical engineering. Eckert published over 550 scientific papers and books. The Eckert number in fluid dynamics was named after him.

In 1995 the National Academy of Engineering honored Eckert with its thirteenth Founders Award.

Eckert's son-in-law Horst Henning Winter, a specialist in rheology, is professor at UMass Amherst.

References and notes

External links
 Short biography of Ernst R. G. Eckert

1904 births
2004 deaths
American aerospace engineers
American science writers
American technology writers
German emigrants to the United States
German people of World War II
20th-century German physicists
NASA people
Scientists from Prague
Engineering educators
University of Minnesota faculty
Fluid dynamicists
Aerodynamicists
Czech Technical University in Prague alumni
German aerospace engineers
Operation Paperclip
20th-century Austrian engineers
20th-century American physicists
20th-century American engineers